The drug combination bismuth subcitrate/metronidazole/tetracycline (trade name Pylera) is used for the treatment of peptic ulcer with an infection by the bacterium Helicobacter pylori. It is taken by mouth.

Medical uses
This combination is used together with omeprazole as a 'quadruple therapy' for the eradication of H. pylori and for preventing peptic ulcers that are caused by this bacterium.

Contraindications
The drug must not be taken by pregnant women, because tetracycline is known to cause tooth and bone defects in unborn children. It is also contraindicated in breastfeeding women, children up to 12 years of age, and by patients with impaired liver or renal (kidney) function, because no studies in such persons have been conducted. Tetracycline is also likely to be harmful in liver patients.

Adverse effects
Common side effects include diarrhoea, nausea and dysgeusia (distortion of the sense of taste), especially a metallic taste. These effects are known from the drug's components as well as from other antibiotics. A very rare but dangerous reaction is Stevens–Johnson syndrome, a life-threatening condition affecting the skin, which has also been described under metronidazole and tetracycline as separate drugs.

Interactions

Metronidazole in combination with alcohol causes severe reactions such as vomiting and flushes in many patients. Tetracycline resorption is reduced by dairy products, antacids and other products containing calcium, magnesium, aluminium as well as iron.

Mechanism of action

Chemical properties
Bismuth subcitrate potassium is a salt of bismuth (Bi3+), potassium (K+) and citrate (C6H5O73−), containing about 25.6% (mass percent) bismuth, which is the active moiety, and 22.9% potassium. Tetracycline is contained as the hydrochloride, and metronidazole as the pure substance.

References

Helicobacter pylori
Combination drugs
Bismuth
AbbVie brands